This is a sortable list of the groups into which the rock succession of Great Britain and surrounding seas is formally divided. Rock sequences are described by geologists by dividing them hierarchically thus: individual 'beds' of rock (or in the case of certain volcanic rocks, 'flows') are grouped into 'members', members are grouped into 'formations', formations into 'groups' and groups occasionally into 'supergroups'. Some groups are also subdivided into 'subgroups'. Not all of these hierarchical layers are necessarily present or defined within a particular rock succession. Many of these groups will be encountered as 'series' in older geological literature or indeed simply as the proper name e.g. 'Dalradian' or 'Millstone Grit' though care needs to be exercised as many of the names have or have had other meanings which may not coincide with the assemblage of rocks referred to formally through designation as a 'group'.

Note that with all such stratigraphical terms as 'groups', 'formations' and 'members' it is standard practice to capitalise both the proper name and the 'term-word' as per the recommendation of the International Commission on Stratigraphy e.g. Wentnor Group and not Wentnor group.

Notes:

Column 1 indicates the name of the geological group. Those marked with an asterisk are no longer formally recognised but are included as they occur widely in literature.

Column 2 indicates during which geological period the rocks of each group were deposited. Note that where more than one period is indicated deposition stretched across the period boundary in at least a part of the group's geographical extent but not necessarily across the whole of its extent.

Column 3 permits sorting by period in chronological order ie Quaternary Period is 01; Neogene,03; Palaeogene,05; Cretaceous,07; Jurassic,09 Triassic,11; Permian,13; Carboniferous,15; Devonian,17; Silurian,19; Ordovician,21; Cambrian,23; Ediacaran,25; Cryogenian,27; Tonian,29; Stenian, 31; and Ectasian, 33 - the last five being some of the periods into which the Proterozoic Eon is divided.

Column 4 indicates in which of the three nations of Great Britain, the group is known to occur, followed by which of the surrounding sea areas (if any), including specifically: Atlantic Ocean, Celtic Sea, English Channel, Irish Sea, North Sea. (At present, for the purposes of this table 'Celtic Sea' also includes the Bristol Channel whilst 'Atlantic Ocean' includes all sea areas off the west coast of Scotland.) Note that the Isle of Man is not a part of Great Britain but is included here for convenience.

Supergroups
The following 'supergroups', i.e. assemblages of 'groups', are recognised:
 Carboniferous Limestone Supergroup
 Culm Supergroup
 Dalradian Supergroup
 Great Britain Superficial Deposits Supergroup
 Leadhills Supergroup
 Longmyndian Supergroup
 Moine Supergroup
 New Red Sandstone Supergroup
 Old Red Sandstone Supergroup
 Pebidian Supergroup
 Windermere Supergroup

Subgroups
The following 'subgroups', i.e. subdivisions of 'groups', have been named:

Albion Glacigenic Group:
 Shetland Glacigenic (Albion) Subgroup
 Western Isles (Albion) Glacigenic Subgroup
 Northwest Highlands (Albion) Glacigenic Subgroup
 Banffshire Coast and Caithness (Albion) Glacigenic Subgroup
 Inverness (Albion) Glacigenic Subgroup
 East Grampian (Albion) Glacigenic Subgroup
 Logie-Buchan (Albion) Glacigenic Subgroup
 Central Grampian (Albion) Glacigenic Subgroup
 Mearns (Albion) Glacigenic Subgroup
 Midland Valley (Albion) Glacigenic Subgroup
 Borders (Albion) Glacigenic Subgroup
 Southern Uplands (Albion) Glacigenic Subgroup
 Irish Sea Coast (Albion) Glacigenic Subgroup
 Manx (Albion) Glacigenic Subgroup
 Central Cumbria (Albion) Glacigenic Subgroup
 North Pennine (Albion) Glacigenic Subgroup
 North Sea Coast (Albion) Glacigenic Subgroup
 Wales (Albion) Glacigenic Subgroup

Appin Group:
 Blair Atholl Subgroup
 Ballachulish Subgroup
 Lochaber Subgroup

Ardmillan Group:
 Ardwell Subgroup
 Drummuck Subgroup
 Whitehouse Subgroup

Argyll Group:
 Tayvallich Subgroup
 Crinan Subgroup
 Easdale Subgroup
 Islay Subgroup

Badenoch Group:
 Dava Subgroup
 Glen Banchor Subgroup

Britannia Catchments Group:
 Northern Highlands and Argyll Catchments Subgroup
 Grampian Catchments Subgroup
 Tay Catchments Subgroup
 Forth Catchments Subgroup
 Clyde Catchments Subgroup
 Tweed Catchments Subgroup
 Solway Catchments Subgroup
 Northumbria Catchments Subgroup
 Isle of Man Catchments Subgroup
 Cheshire-North Wales Catchments Subgroup
 Yorkshire Catchments Subgroup
 Trent Catchments Subgroup
 Severn and Avon Catchments Subgroup
 West Wales Catchments Subgroup
 Ouse-Nene Catchments Subgroup
 Yare Catchments Subgroup
 Somerset Catchments Subgroup
 Thames Catchments Subgroup
 Suffolk Catchments Subgroup
 Cornubian Catchments Subgroup
 Solent Catchments Subgroup
 Sussex Catchments Subgroup
 South Kent Catchments Subgroup
Grampian Group
 Glen Spean Subgroup
 Corrieyairack Subgroup
 Glenshirra Subgroup

Caledonia Glacigenic Group:
 Shetland Glacigenic Subgroup
 Western Isles Glacigenic Subgroup
 Northwest Highlands Glacigenic Subgroup
 Banffshire Coast and Caithness Glacigenic Subgroup
 Inverness Glacigenic Subgroup
 East Grampian Glacigenic Subgroup
 Logie-Buchan Glacigenic Subgroup
 Central Grampian Glacigenic Subgroup
 Mearns Glacigenic Subgroup
 Midland Valley Glacigenic Subgroup
 Borders Glacigenic Subgroup
 Southern Uplands Glacigenic Subgroup
 Irish Sea Coast Glacigenic Subgroup
 Manx Glacigenic Subgroup
 Central Cumbria Glacigenic Subgroup
 North Pennine Glacigenic Subgroup
 North Sea Coast Glacigenic Subgroup
 Wales Glacigenic Subgroup

Lower Old Red Sandstone Group:
 Brecon Subgroup
 Cosheston Subgroup
 Ditton Subgroup
 Downton Subgroup
 Milford Haven Subgroup

Pembroke Limestone Group:
 Blackrock Limestone Subgroup
 Clydach Valley Subgroup

Ogwen Group
 Nant Ffrancon Subgroup

References
 Searchable database of British rock names on BGS website
 Waters et al. 2007. Stratigraphical Chart of the United Kingdom: Southern Britain British Geological Survey (poster) 
 Waters et al. 2007. Stratigraphical Chart of the United Kingdom: Northern Britain British Geological Survey (poster) 

Geology of England
Geology of Scotland
Geology of Wales
Stratigraphy of the United Kingdom
 
Geological groups